Genevieve Woo Marn Huong (born August 3, 1969) is a Singapore television journalist and news presenter with Mediacorp.

Early life and education
Woo attended Marymount Convent School and Raffles Junior College in Singapore. She read English language and literature at the National University of Singapore.

Career
Woo has wide-ranging experience in the media and communications industry, where she has worked in a variety of roles.

After graduating from university, Woo started out as a copywriter in advertising before turning to print journalism. In 1999, she joined Parkway Holdings where she managed corporate communications. She returned to journalism in 2003, serving for a year as an assistant editor at TODAY, a free English-language tabloid in Singapore.

In 2004, she crossed over to parent company MediaCorp and served as its vice-president of corporate communications before joining Channel NewsAsia in 2007.

During her time with Channel NewsAsia, she fronted the channel's highly rated news programme Singapore Tonight, which airs daily between 10:00 pm and 10:30 pm (Singapore/Hong Kong time). In addition, she fronted Cents & Sensibilities, a weekly current affairs show on how the person in the street should make investments. Woo was previously a presenter on Asia Business Tonight, East Asia Tonight, Asia Today and World Today.

She left Channel NewsAsia in 2014 and joined Hyflux, a Singaporean company specializing in water engineering on April 2, 2014, as the Senior Vice President, Corporate Marketing and Communications.

Woo is also a member of the executive committee of the Guild of Jewellery Professionals and Artisans (GJPA), a not-for-profit society with headquarters in Singapore.

In 2015, Woo rejoined Mediacorp and currently presents News 5 on Mediacorp Channel 5 and News Now on Channel NewsAsia.

Film-making
In 2006, Woo set up film-production company Mythopolis Pictures with Singapore-based American film director Tony Kern.

In 2007, Woo co-produced a short film called The Mitre Spell, which weaves a whimsy tale around the mysteriously spooky, colonial-era Mitre Hotel off Killiney Road in Singapore. The film premiered at the 2007 Singapore International Film Festival. The Mitre Spell was short-listed for The Best of First Take 2008, a special screening of audience favourites of each month, organised by The Substation.

Another film, A Month of Hungry Ghosts, which Woo and Kern co-produced, made its debut in local cinemas on August 7, 2008. The feature film captures the rituals and performances throughout an entire seventh-lunar-month Hungry Ghost Festival in Singapore. A Month of Hungry Ghosts was nominated for Best Film at the inaugural Singapore Film Awards at the 22nd Singapore International Film Festival.

Jewellery designing
Woo owns Vintage Bunny, an online jewellery store specialising in modern handmade and authentic vintage jewellery, created using natural stones, pearls, Balinese silver and Austrian crystals.

References

External links
 Channel NewsAsia
 Cents & Sensibilities Official Website 
 A Month of Hungry Ghosts Official Website
 Mythopolis Pictures
 Vintage Bunny
 The Substation
 Golden Village
 Sinema Old School
 Guild of Jewellery Professionals and Artisans 

1969 births
Singaporean broadcast news analysts
Singaporean television journalists
Singaporean television personalities
Singaporean journalists
Singaporean film producers
Singaporean people of Chinese descent
Mediacorp
National University of Singapore alumni
Raffles Junior College alumni
Singaporean Roman Catholics
Living people
Singaporean women journalists